The Slave Point Formation is a stratigraphical unit of Middle Devonian age in the Western Canadian Sedimentary Basin. 

It takes the name from Slave Point, a promontory on the north-west shore of the Great Slave Lake, and was first described in outcrop on the southern shore of the lake and along the Buffalo River by A.E. Cameron in 1918. It was subsequently defined in the subsurface by J. Law in 1955, based on lithology encountered in the California Standard Steen River 2-22-117-5W6M well in Alberta.

Lithology
The Slave Point Formation is composed of brown limestone, crystalline dolomite and shale laminae.
It contains stromatoporoids in north-eastern British Columbia and southern Northwest Territories and in the Peace River Arch.

Distribution
It occurs in southern Northwest Territories, northeastern British Columbia and northern Alberta.

Relationship to other units
The Slave Point Formation is unconformably overlain by the Beaverhill Lake Group or Waterways Formation in northern Alberta and by the Otter Park Member or Muskwa Member of the Horn River Formation in north-eastern British Columbia. It conformably overlays the Fort Vermilion Formation (or is unconformably overlain by the Watt Mountain Formation) in northern Alberta and it is conformably overlain by the Sulphur Point Formation or Presqu'ile Formation in north-eastern British Columbia.

It is equivalent to the lower Swan Hills Formation and partly to the Livock River Formation.

References

Stratigraphy of Alberta
Stratigraphy of British Columbia
Stratigraphy of the Northwest Territories
Devonian southern paleotropical deposits
Middle Devonian Series